The men's shot put event at the 2010 World Junior Championships in Athletics was held in Moncton, New Brunswick, Canada, at Moncton Stadium on 21 July.  A 6 kg (junior implement) shot was used.

Medalists

Results

Final
21 July

Qualifications
21 July

Group A

Group B

Participation
According to an unofficial count, 30 athletes from 23 countries participated in the event.

References

Shot put
Shot put at the World Athletics U20 Championships